Nawab C. Abdul Hakeem  Saheb (1863–1938), one of the respected natives of Melvisharam, Prince among traders and one time Sheriff of Madras. He was a Muslim trader and politician from the Madras Presidency. He set up a tannery in 1907 and emerged as a prosperous businessman serving as President of the Southern Indian Chamber of Commerce. He founded the Melvisharam Muslim Educational Society in 1918 with a golden dream of transforming his town into a splendid seat of great learning to cater to the educational needs of youth. Like the winds that have no barriers of caste or community, the Nawab’s generosity lighted the lamp of joy and contentment in several poverty-ridden families. His colorful dreams have all been realized by the Melvisharam Muslim Educational Society that strove hard to transform Primary, Secondary and Higher Education into splendid segments of pristine enlightenment irrespective of caste, creed, community or social status. The work continues even now with zeal and rejuvenating spirit.

Early life 

C.Abdul Hakeem was born in North Arcot district of India in 1863 and at age of 21 he moved to the city of Madras in 1884 to join his father Siddique Hussain Sahib. Having picked up the ropes of business, he started in 1907 a small business in hides and skins but grew it to such an extent that he became a merchant prince and a major donor to charities. The best-known of charitable contributions is Siddique Sarai Mosque, the Muslim choultry opposite Central Station. His son Late C.Siddique (Named after his father) continued with philanthropic work.

Politics 

Hakim founded the Madras Provincial Muslim League in 1908. Later, he started the Muslim Progressive Party and served as its President. Hakim was appointed Sheriff of Madras in 1930 and elected to the Madras Legislative Assembly in 1937.

Melvisharam Muslim Educational Society 
C. Abdul Hakeem founded Melvisharam Muslim Educational Society. The Society has gradually progressed across these 8 decades. To start with, there was only a Primary School under this Society. And at present, it manages 11 Institutions from the nursery level to a First Grade College with Five P.G. Departments and Three Research Departments. They include M.M.E.S. Arts and science college for women and C. Abdul Hakeem College of Engineering and Technology, an I.S.O certified Centre of learning.

The College was instituted in the year 1965 with just Pre-University Course, in the local orphanage buildings. Subsequently the M.M.E.S. acquired a site of more than 67 acres, on the eastern outskirts of the town, on the Chennai-Bangalore Trunk road, and constructed imposing buildings to house the College and the Hostel. The college is affiliated to Thiruvalluvar University, Vellore. The college has been Re-accredited by the NAAC with 'A' Grade.
At present, the College offers instruction in 31 Courses at Under-Graduate level and in 6 Courses at Post-Graduate level, apart from facilities for research leading to the award of Ph.D.
MMES manages and maintains the following prominent institutions.

 C. Abdul Hakeem College of Engineering and Technology
 C.Abdul Hakeem College of Arts and Science (Autonomous) (for Men) (Re-Accredited by NAAC with B++ Grade)
 M.M.E.S Women s Arts & Science College
 Islamiah Boys Higher Secondary School
 Islamiah Girls Higher Secondary School
 Islamiah Primary School for Boys
 Islamiah Primary School for Girls
 Hakeem Matriculation School
 F.M. Primary School
 R.A. Primary School

Siddique Sarai Mosque 
Siddique Sarai Mosque is a choultry built in 19th Century for Muslim travelers in Park Town area of Chennai, the capital of the South Indian state of Tamil Nadu by C. Abdul Hakeem. . 
When Abdul Hakim’s ailing father once arrived at Central from Bombay he found that there was no choultry nearby with facilities for Muslim travelers. Build one, he suggested to his son. And so, Abdul Hakim bought land opposite Ripon Building in an auction for Rs. 50,000 and laid the foundation stone for the Sarai in 1919. Claiming that the building was coming too near its tracks, the South Indian Railway raised objections to its construction.
The consequent case went up to the Privy Council and, eventually, after its ruling, the building was completed and inaugurated in 1921. The Sarai is now vested in the Jamaath of the Periamet mosque. Among Abdul Hakim’s other contributions are the Muslim High School in Triplicane, of which he was one of the founders. In Melvisharam, a higher secondary school and an engineering college bear his name. He was Sheriff of Madras in 1930 and in 1937 was elected to the Madras Legislative Assembly from North Madras.

References 

1863 births
1938 deaths
People from Vellore district